Havnia (minor planet designation: 362 Havnia) is a typical Main belt asteroid.

It was discovered by Auguste Charlois on 12 March 1893 in Nice, France.

It is spinning with a rotation period of 16.92 hours. The inferred shape of this object resembles a Maclaurin spheroid.

References

External links 
 
 

Background asteroids
Havnia
Havnia
XC-type asteroids (Tholen)
18930312